Dinosaur Kingdom II (also called Escape From Dinosaur Kingdom) is a tourist attraction in Natural Bridge, Virginia, consisting of statues which depict a dinosaur attack on the Union Army. The park contains thirty fiberglass dinosaur statues, a smaller number of Union soldiers, and several other characters, including Abraham Lincoln and a gorilla in a cowboy hat. Dinosaur Kingdom, which opened in 2005, is the work of local artist Mark Cline, who also created nearby Foamhenge.

The park's statues are built around the premise that paleontologists discovered dinosaurs in Virginia in 1863; when the Union Army attempted to use the dinosaurs as weapons, the dinosaurs turned on them. Cline originally planned to have the dinosaurs besiege Pancho Villa's army, but chose to use the Union Army instead to win local favor, claiming "people still fight the Civil War down here". Cline had desired to build dinosaur statues ever since stopping at the Dinosaur Land park in White Post, Virginia in his youth; his inspiration for Dinosaur Kingdom's theme came from the movie The Valley of Gwangi, in which cowboys discovered living dinosaurs in a Mexican valley.

According to Cline, Northerners have never complained about playing the villain in the attraction; he plans to open a similar park at Gettysburg reenacting Pickett's Charge with dinosaurs, in which the Confederates will be attacked.

References

External links
Visit Natural Bridge - Escape From Dinosaur Kingdom

Tourist attractions in Rockbridge County, Virginia
Roadside attractions in Virginia
2005 establishments in Virginia
Dinosaurs in popular culture
Dinosaur sculptures
American Civil War alternate histories